No Boston Olympics was a grassroots organization and movement that advocated against the city of Boston, MA’s bid to host the 2024 Olympic Games. The group was started by Liam Kerr, Chris Dempsey, and Kelley Gossett in late 2013 in opposition to Boston 2024, an effort by city leaders and prominent members of the local business community to make Boston the United States Olympic & Paralympic Committee (USOPC)'s bid to host the Olympic Games in the summer of 2024. No Boston Olympics highlighted the economic risks associated with hosting the Olympics, arguing that members of the Greater Boston community would be negatively impacted if the city were to move forward with its attempt to host the games. The group and its organizers have been credited with playing an instrumental role in influencing the USOPC's July 2015 decision to withdraw Boston's bid from consideration by the International Olympic Committee (IOC).

Background 
No Boston Olympics started as an informal conversation between Liam Kerr and Chris Dempsey in Kerr's Beacon Hill, Boston living room in November 2013. At the time, Boston was listed among a number of cities in the United States under consideration to be the United States Olympic & Paralympic Committee (USOPC)'s bid to host the Olympic Games in 2024. Kerr, Dempsey, and others were concerned about the potential harmful consequences that hosting the Olympics might have for residents of the city and its economy. The pair formed No Boston Olympics along with Kerr's friend, Conor Yunits, in response to growing public advocacy by the Boston 2024 Committee, which promoted the city's host bid.

In June 2014, the USOPC announced that Boston had made its shortlist of potential U.S. host cities for the summer 2024 games. After connecting with Kerr and voicing similar concerns about the financial impact of hosting the Olympics in Boston, Kelley Gossett joined No Boston Olympics as a fourth co-chair. During this early period, the group focused much of its effort on working to convince the USOPC not to choose Boston as its 2024 bid and calling on the Boston 2024 Committee to share more information about its proposal.

In December 2014, Yunits parted ways with the group and announced that he had since become a supporter of Boston's bid to host the 2024 Olympics. Later that month, the USOPC made the formal announcement that it would make a bid to host the 2024 Olympics.

On January 8, 2015, the USOPC announced that it had officially selected Boston as its candidate to host the 2024 Olympic games.
In response to the decision, No Boston Olympics announced that it would continue to oppose the bid while also pursuing a new set of objectives related to improving its substance, including:
 Arguing that the City of Boston should be protected from having to pay expenses incurred because of budget shortfalls resulting from the bid
 Calling on Boston 2024 to provide complete audit access to "an independent watchdog organization" for at least a year past the conclusion of the 2024 games
 Encouraging Boston 2024 to withhold a $600 million payment to the USOPC (which was intended to cover marketing expenses during the six-year window leading up to the 2024 Olympics) until after the games
Despite No Boston Olympics' continued opposition to Boston's 2024 bid, Dempsey suggested that the group would be "a lot more comfortable" with the prospect of hosting if its objectives were fulfilled.

On January 14, 2014, No Boston Olympics hosted a public meeting with Andrew Zimbalist, a professor of economics at Smith College in Northampton, MA and a vocal critic of Boston's bid to host the Olympics. A week later, WBUR and MassINC released their first poll on the issue, demonstrating that 51% of Boston-area residents supported their city's bid to host the Olympics — while 33% opposed it. By the time WBUR and MassINC released their final poll on the matter in July 2015, support among Boston-area residents had dipped to 40% and opposition had risen to 53%.

Finally, on July 14, 2015, Boston Mayor Marty Walsh announced that he could not sign the USOPC's required Host City Contract, citing insufficient public support for Boston's 2024 bid. By early afternoon the same day, the USOPC had announced that it would formally withdraw Boston as its bid. According to USOPC chief executive Scott Blackmun, the decision was made because they had "not been able to get a majority of the citizens of Boston to support hosting the 2024 Olympic and Paralympic Games."

Aftermath 
No Boston Olympics and its organizers have been credited with playing a critical role in defeating Boston's 2024 Olympic bid.

In 2017, Chris Dempsey and Andrew Zimbalist published a book about the No Boston Olympics movement titled No Boston Olympics: How and Why Smart Cities are Passing on the Torch.

Local media questioned what future political roles the founders would pursue. In 2021, Chris Dempsey launched a campaign for Massachusetts State Auditor in 2022 and won the endorsement of the Massachusetts Democratic Party at the convention in 2022. Liam Kerr founded Welcome PAC, which supports Democratic candidates in swing districts. Kelley Gossett went on to work for Uber and Airbnb.

References 

2024 Summer Olympics
2013 establishments in Massachusetts
Sports in Boston